MaChelle Kay Joseph (born January 13, 1970) is an American women's basketball coach, who served as the head coach for Georgia Tech from 2003 to 2019. Under Joseph, the Yellow Jackets compiled a record of 273–176. Joseph was fired on March 26, 2019, by AD Todd Stansbury and the Georgia Tech Athletic Administration after being accused of abusing and bullying players.  She denies these accusations and filed suit against Georgia Tech Athletics, the Board of Regents, and 4 individuals on July 23, 2019.  She claims her termination was a culmination of an unlawful campaign of retaliation against her for advocating for gender equity in athletics at Georgia Tech, and that for years, Georgia Tech has provided sub-standard resources to its women's basketball program including in facilities, marketing, travel, and funding, while providing significantly more and superior resources to its men's basketball program.  Joseph served as the Head Women's Basketball Coach at GT for 16 years and amassed more wins than any other coach in GT WBB history.

Playing career 
Highlights of Joseph's career include:

 As a senior at DeKalb High School, she averaged a state-best 35.1 points per game, and was selected as a 1988 Indiana All-Star, Parade Magazine and Street & Smith’s All-American.
 She totaled 1,633 career points at DeKalb, where she led teams to three conference and two sectional titles.
 She was named to the USA Basketball Women's Junior National Team (now called the U19 team).
She was a four-year starter at Purdue University, where she set school and Big Ten Conference records for career points (2,405) and career assists (628). At Purdue, her teams won 96 games in four years, a 1991 Big Ten Championship and reached two NCAA Sweet 16s.
She was named to the USA team competing in the 1992 William Jones Cup competition in Taipei, Taiwan. The team won all eight games and won the gold medal. Joseph averaged 11.0 points per game, third highest on the team.
 She was a three-time 1st team all-conference player, a 1992 Big Ten Player of the Year, and All-American, 1992 National Player of the Year.
 She was inducted into the Purdue Intercollegiate Hall of Fame on September 24, 2010, and was named one of Purdue's "Legends of Mackey" in January 2012. 
 She was a member of the 2013 Silver Anniversary Team.
 She was inducted into the Indiana Basketball Hall of Fame in 2015.

Coaching career 
Highlights of Joseph's coaching career:

 Amassed ten 20-win seasons and seven NCAA tournament appearances, including six-straight from 2007 through 2012. 
 Under Joseph's direction, 17 Yellow Jackets have garnered All-ACC accolades. Two Jackets have been named All-ACC First Team members since Joseph became the head coach in 2003. Eight freshmen have been named to the All-ACC Freshman Team.
 Coached seven Jackets that were selected in the WNBA Draft, three of these in the first round. 
 Named the Georgia College Women's Coach of the Year twice in her tenure and five of her players were recognized as the Georgia College Players of the Year.

Joseph was born and grew up in Auburn, Indiana and is the fourth of 7 brothers and sisters.

Purdue statistics
Source

Head coaching record

References

External links

 Official bio

1970 births
Living people
All-American college women's basketball players
American women's basketball coaches
Auburn Tigers women's basketball coaches
Basketball coaches from Indiana
Basketball players from Indiana
Georgia Tech Yellow Jackets women's basketball coaches
Parade High School All-Americans (girls' basketball)
People from Auburn, Indiana
Purdue Boilermakers women's basketball coaches
Purdue Boilermakers women's basketball players
Big Ten Athlete of the Year winners